Draper Richards is a private equity firm focused on venture capital investments in U.S. technology companies.  The firm was founded in 1996 by Bill Draper, an early venture capitalist who had previously founded Sutter Hill Ventures, and Robin Richards Donohoe.  The firm invests principally on behalf of the Draper Richards Foundation, a non profit organization.

Investments 
Draper has been a founding investor in such notable companies as Activision (acquired by Mediagenic), Apollo Computer (acquired by Hewlett Packard), Dionex, Hybritech (acquired by Eli Lilly and Company), Integrated Genetics (acquired by Genzyme), LSI Logic, Measurex, PowerReviews, Quantum, Qume (acquired by ITT Corporation) and Xidex (acquired by Eastman Kodak), among others.

Draper Richards maintains an active philanthropic program through the "Draper Richards Kaplan Fellows" organization.  The foundation is noted for providing early-stage grants to charity and community organizations, but demanding comprehensive business plans and other startup-like diligence and reporting.

See also
 William Henry Draper, Jr.
 Horace Rowan Gaither 
Draper Fisher Jurvetson, a venture capital firm founded by Timothy C. Draper
 Draper Richards Kaplan Foundation, a private foundation that invests philanthropic venture, founded by the same people

References

External links
Draper Richards (company website)

Venture capital firms of the United States
Financial services companies established in 1996
Companies based in Menlo Park, California